Ettringen is a municipality in the district of Mayen-Koblenz in Rhineland-Palatinate, western Germany. 

The nearby abandoned stone quarry Ettringer Lay serves as a popular climbing area of the German Alpine Club (DAV) with more than 790 routes set in the basalt walls.

References

Municipalities in Rhineland-Palatinate
Mayen-Koblenz
Climbing areas of Germany